David Daniel Marriott (born November 2, 1939) is an American politician who served as a member of the United States House of Representatives for Utah's 2nd congressional district from 1977 to 1985.

Early life and education 
Born in Bingham, Utah, Marriott was educated in the public schools of Sandy, Utah, and graduated from Jordan High School in 1958. He received a Bachelor of Science degree from the University of Utah in 1967 and was designated as a Chartered Life Underwriter (CLU) by the American College of Life Underwriters in 1968.

Career 
He later worked as a life insurance agent and was the owner/president of a Utah-based firm specializing in business and pension consultation from 1968 to 1976. Marriott also served in the Utah Air National Guard from 1958 to 1963.

Marriott was elected to the United States House of Representatives as a Republican in 1976. He was not a candidate for re-election in 1984, instead running for governor of Utah. In the 1984 Utah gubernatorial election, he lost to state House speaker Norm Bangerter, 94,421 to 72,883. He ran for his former House seat in 1990, but lost the Republican primary to Genevieve Atwood.

Marriott served as a Mission president for the Church of Jesus Christ of Latter-day Saints from 2002 to 2005. He served in the South Africa Cape Town Mission.

Personal life 
He is a resident of Salt Lake City, Utah and has 12 grandchildren.

References

Sources

1939 births
Latter Day Saints from Utah
American Mormon missionaries in South Africa
Living people
Politicians from Salt Lake City
People from Sandy, Utah
University of Utah alumni
People from Bingham Canyon, Utah
Republican Party members of the United States House of Representatives from Utah